Bai Di may refer to:

 Baidicheng (白帝), ancient temple complex on a hill on the northern shore of the Yangtze River in China
 White Di or Bai Di (白狄), a subgroup of the Northern Di people